Bhemaa is a 1984 Bollywood film starring Shatrughan Sinha and Jaya Prada.

Plot
Inspector Bheem Singh is a noble police officer who gets frustrated by his greedy wife Seema, he changes totally and becomes a bandit named Bheema.

Soundtrack
Lyrics: Anjaan

External links
 

1984 films
1980s Hindi-language films
Films scored by R. D. Burman